is a Japanese National College of Technology that is located in Tsuruoka, Yamagata. The abbreviated name is TNCT (Japanese: 鶴岡高専; Tsuruoka Kousen)。

History
1963 Tsuruoka National College of Technology was founded on April 1, 1963 (the two-class Department of Mechanical Engineering class and Department of Electronic Engineering).
1967　Department of Industrial Chemistry established.
1990　Department of Control and Information Systems Engineering came into being by reorganizing the two-class Department of Mechanical Engineering.
1993　Department of Industrial Chemistry was reorganized into Department of Material Engineering.
2003　Advanced Engineering Course was established.
2004　After the "Institution of National Colleges of Technology Japan" Act was enacted, this college has become the Tsuruoka College of Technology of the Institute of National Colleges of Technology Japan.
2005　Department of Electrical Engineering was renamed Department of Electrical and Electronics Engineering.

Departments

Regular Course (Associate's degree Course)
Five years' course.
Department of Mechanical Engineering
Department of Electrical and Electronics Engineering
Department of Control and Information Systems Engineering
Department of Material Engineering

Advanced Engineering Course (Bachelor's Degree Course)
Two years' course.
Graduated regular course student can enter this course after entrance examination acceptance. 	
Department of Mechanical and Electrical Engineering	 	
Department of Chemical and Biological Engineering

See also
Colleges of technology in Japan

Presidents
Mosuke Hayashi (1963–1971)
Shingi Saito (1971–1976)
Shozo Watarai (1976–1981)
Mayumi Someno (1981–1986)
Jiro Shimizu (1986–1993)
Mitsuo Abe (1993–2001)
Tsutomu Nonaka (2001–2006)
Masaaki Yokoyama (2006–2011)
Yasushi Kato (2011–2016)
Koji Takahashi (2016–present)

External links
 Tsuruoka National College of Technology (Japanese)

Engineering universities and colleges in Japan
Universities and colleges in Yamagata Prefecture
1963 establishments in Japan
Educational institutions established in 1963
Public universities in Japan
Tsuruoka, Yamagata